The 1999 Sanex Trophy singles was the singles event of the first edition of the Sanex Trophy; a WTA Tier IV tournament and one of the most prestigious women's tennis tournament held in Belgium.

Fourth seed María Sánchez Lorenzo won the title, defeating Denisa Chládková, 6–7(7–9), 6–4, 6–2, and claimed her only title.

Seeds

Draw

Finals

Top half

Bottom half

Qualifying

Seeds

Qualifiers

Qualifying draw

First qualifier

Second qualifier

Third qualifier

Fourth qualifier

External links
 1999 Sanex Trophy Draw

WTA Knokke-Heist
1999 WTA Tour